Dharavi (City of Dreams) is a 1992 Hindi film, directed and written by Sudhir Mishra.

The film was a joint NFDC-Doordarshan production and went on to winning many awards in the following year, including the 1992 National Film Award for Best Feature Film in Hindi. The film was also invited at the London Film Festival, Mannheim International Film Festival and Festival 3 Continents Nantes in 1992.

The film stars Shabana Azmi and Om Puri in lead roles, and is set amidst the backdrop of India's largest slums, Dharavi.

Plot
Raj Karan Yadav (Om Puri) is a scrappy taxi driver, who somehow scrapes a living in the big metropolis of Bombay, driving a taxi every day. He lives in a one-room tenement with his wife (Shabana Azmi) in Dharavi, one of the world's largest slums, where the film is set. The film follows his fortunes as he tries to break out from the clutches of poverty, devising plans and investing all his money in a dubious schemes which eventually blow out on him, coming under the eye of unscrupulous politician and local goons, yet his dreams continue.

Cast
 Shabana Azmi
 Om Puri as Raj Karan Yadav
 Raghuvir Yadav
 Madhuri Dixit
 Anil Kapoor
 Virendra Saxena
 Akhilendra Mishra
 Shakti Singh

Awards
 1992 National Film Award for Best Feature Film in Hindi
 1992 National Film Award for Best Music Direction: Rajat Dholakia
 1992 National Film Award for Best Editing: Renu Saluja

References

External links
 
 Dharavi at NY Times
 Sudhir Mishra comments on his films

1992 films
1990s Hindi-language films
Films set in Mumbai
Films whose editor won the Best Film Editing National Award
Best Hindi Feature Film National Film Award winners
Films directed by Sudhir Mishra
National Film Development Corporation of India films